The discography of Outkast, an American hip hop duo (consisting of rappers André 3000 and Big Boi), consists of six studio albums, one compilation album, one soundtrack album, one video album, 32 singles (including eight as featured artists), three promotional singles, and 21 music videos. In 1992, Outkast became the first hip hop act to be signed to the label LaFace Records; with their first studio album Southernplayalisticadillacmuzik (1994) that debuted at number 20 on the US Billboard 200. Southernplayalisticadillacmuzik spawned the commercially successful single "Player's Ball", which reached number 37 on the US Billboard Hot 100. It was later certified gold by the Recording Industry Association of America (RIAA). Their following two albums, ATLiens (1996) and Aquemini (1998), were commercially successful in the United States; both albums peaked at number two on the Billboard 200, and were certified double-platinum by the RIAA. Three singles were released from each album; all three from ATLiens charted on the Billboard Hot 100, with "Elevators (Me & You)" peaking at number 12, making it the most successful. The lead single from Aquemini, "Rosa Parks", peaked at number 55 on the Billboard Hot 100: two more singles, "Skew It on the Bar-B" and "Da Art of Storytellin' (Pt. 1)", were released from the album. In 1998, Outkast collaborated with hip hop group Goodie Mob on the single "Black Ice (Sky High)" and with rapper Cool Breeze on the single "Watch for the Hook"; the singles peaked at numbers 50 and 73 on the Billboard Hot 100, respectively.

Outkast's fourth studio album Stankonia was their first to achieve success outside the United States; as well as peaking at number two on the Billboard 200, it appeared on the Australian, German and United Kingdom albums charts, along with several others in Europe. Although the lead single "B.O.B" only peaked at number 69 on the US Hot R&B/Hip-Hop Songs chart, the following single "Ms. Jackson" became their first to top the Billboard Hot 100, and peaked in the top ten of many other singles charts. The album's third single "So Fresh, So Clean" peaked at number 30 on the Billboard Hot 100. A compilation album, Big Boi and Dre Present... Outkast, was released in 2001, with "The Whole World" as the album's only single.

In 2003, Outkast released a double album, Speakerboxxx/The Love Below, that became their first album to reach number one on the Billboard 200. It was later certified 11-times-platinum by the RIAA, and was certified double-platinum in the United Kingdom by the British Phonographic Industry (BPI) and in New Zealand by Recorded Music NZ (RMNZ). The lead single, "Hey Ya!", peaked at number one on the Billboard Hot 100 and also topped the Australian and Swedish singles charts. "The Way You Move", a collaboration with singer Sleepy Brown, also topped the Hot 100, and the third single, "Roses", reached the top ten in many territories. "Ghetto Musick" and "Prototype" were released as the final two singles from the album. In 2006 Outkast released their sixth studio album, Idlewild, which also served as the soundtrack to the film of the same name. The first single from the album, "Mighty O", peaked at number 77 on the Billboard Hot 100. The second "Morris Brown" was a moderate hit on the charts, the third single only peaked at number 100 and the following two singles "Hollywood Divorce" and "The Train" did not chart. Idlewild was met with lukewarm reviews from music critics and from fans. The album was certified platinum by the RIAA.

Albums

Studio albums

Compilation albums

Video albums

Singles

As lead artist

As featured artist

Promotional singles (as featured artist)

Other charted songs

Guest appearances

Music videos

As lead artist

As featured artist

See also
 André 3000 discography
 Big Boi discography
 List of songs recorded by Outkast

Notes 

A  "Git Up, Git Out" did not enter the Billboard Hot 100, but peaked at number 9 on the Bubbling Under Hot 100 Singles chart, which acts as an extension to the Hot 100.
B  "Land of a Million Drums" did not enter the Hot R&B/Hip-Hop Songs chart, but peaked at number 16 on the Bubbling Under R&B/Hip-Hop Singles chart, which acts as an extension to the Hot R&B/Hip-Hop Songs chart.
C  "Ghetto Musick" and "Prototype" charted as a double A-side single in certain territories.
D  "Morris Brown" did not enter the Hot R&B/Hip-Hop Songs chart, but peaked at number 2 on the Bubbling Under R&B/Hip-Hop Singles chart, which acts as an extension to the Hot R&B/Hip-Hop Songs chart.
E  "Hollywood Divorce" did not enter the Hot R&B/Hip-Hop Songs chart, but peaked at number 20 on the Bubbling Under R&B/Hip-Hop Singles chart, which acts as an extension to the Hot R&B/Hip-Hop Songs chart.
F  "Akshon (Yeah!)" did not enter the Hot R&B/Hip-Hop Songs chart, but peaked at number 13 on the Bubbling Under R&B/Hip-Hop Singles chart, which acts as an extension to the Hot R&B/Hip-Hop Songs chart.
G  "Gone Be Fine" did not enter the Hot R&B/Hip-Hop Songs chart, but peaked at number 5 on the Bubbling Under R&B/Hip-Hop Singles chart, which acts as an extension to the Hot R&B/Hip-Hop Songs chart.
H  "In Due Time" did not enter the Hot R&B/Hip-Hop Songs chart, but peaked at number 75 on the Hot R&B/Hip-Hop Airplay chart.
I  "SpottieOttieDopaliscious" did not enter the Hot R&B/Hip-Hop Songs chart, but peaked at number 5 on the Bubbling Under R&B/Hip-Hop Singles chart, which acts as an extension to the Hot R&B/Hip-Hop Songs chart.

References

External links
 Official website
 Outkast at AllMusic
 
 

Discographies of American artists
Hip hop discographies
Discography